Troy Patrick Archibald-Henville (born 4 November 1988) is a retired English professional footballer and current youth coach for Tottenham Hotspur.

Playing career

Tottenham Hotspur 
Born in Newham, London, Archibald-Henville joined Tottenham Hotspur full-time in 2005 after a successful spell towards the end of the 2004–05 season. He made the step up to the reserves in 2007 making 15 appearances in total, scoring two goals. His impressive performances earned him the captain's armband for the reserves. He was named on the substitutes bench for the first team on two occasions, including the North London derby at Arsenal in December 2007.

Norwich City 
For the 2008–09 season, Norwich City took Archibald-Henville on what was initially a season long loan, but he returned to Tottenham without making a league appearance.

Exeter City 
On 20 January 2009, Archibald-Henville signed on loan for Exeter City, and made his debut for the club that night, in a 2–1 win against Dagenham & Redbridge. During his time there, Archibald-Henville was hailed as "terrific" by Exeter manager Paul Tisdale.

Before his debut, Exeter asked the Football League if they could just put "Troy" on the back of his shirt but were told the entire surname had to be there, without exception.

At the end of the Grecians' successful 2008–09 season, which saw them win promotion to League One, Archibald-Henville returned to his parent club in a bid to win a new contract with Spurs. He signed a new deal at Tottenham until 2010.

In July 2009, he signed another six-month loan deal with Exeter.

Exeter City 
On 1 February 2010, it was announced that Archibald-Henville had signed a permanent deal with Exeter City, moving from Tottenham Hotspur for an undisclosed fee. However, he sustained a knee injury shortly after his signing, ruling him out of action for the remainder of the 2009–10 season and the start of the 2010–11 season. After recovering from the injury, he made 81 appearances for Exeter over the 2010–11 and 2011–12 seasons, and was the Exeter supporters' "player of the year" for 2011–12.

Swindon Town 
At the end of the 2011–12 season, Archibald-Henville's contract with Exeter expired. Exeter offered him a new contract, but he instead signed a two-year deal with Swindon Town, who had just been promoted to League One.

Carlisle United 
Due to injuries, Archibald-Henville found it difficult to gain match fitness to force his way into the Town side, so he joined fellow League One side Carlisle on a month-long loan deal in September 2013. The deal was a success, but was cut short due to a knee injury which required surgery. He returned to Swindon Town and made 15 more appearances for the club, as they tried to force their way into the League One play-off.

Carlisle United 
Following his release from Swindon Town at the end of the 2013–14 season, Archibald-Henville penned a two-year deal with Carlisle United, who had been relegated to League Two. He missed the start of the 2014–15 season with a shin injury, and made his first appearance in a 3–0 defeat to Bury in September.

Return to Exeter City 
On 27 June 2016 Archibald-Henville signed with his former club Exeter City following his release from Carlisle.

He was released by Exeter at the end of the 2017–18 season.

Coaching career 
In July 2019 Archibald-Henville assumed a revised role at Tottenham Hotspur, the club with which he began his playing career, as an academy coach assigned with assisting older youth-level players.

Career statistics

References

External links

1988 births
Living people
Footballers from the London Borough of Newham
English footballers
Association football defenders
Tottenham Hotspur F.C. players
Norwich City F.C. players
Exeter City F.C. players
Swindon Town F.C. players
Carlisle United F.C. players
English Football League players
Black British sportspeople
Tottenham Hotspur F.C. non-playing staff
Association football coaches